The 1852 Michigan gubernatorial election was held on November 2, 1852. Incumbent Democrat Robert McClelland defeated Whig nominee Zachariah Chandler with 51.07% of the vote.

General election

Candidates
Major party candidates
Robert McClelland, Democratic
Zachariah Chandler, Whig
Other candidates
Isaac P. Christiancy, Free Soil

Results

References

1852
Michigan
Gubernatorial
November 1852 events